Strawn Pass is a broad pass on the south side of McDonald Heights that connects the heads of Kirkpatrick Glacier and Johnson Glacier, in Marie Byrd Land. Mapped by United States Geological Survey (USGS) from surveys and U.S. Navy air photos, 1959–69. Named by Advisory Committee on Antarctic Names (US-ACAN) for Lawrence W. Strawn, glaciologist at Byrd Station, 1967–68.

References

Mountain passes of Antarctica
Landforms of Marie Byrd Land